The Dead Files is an American paranormal television series, airing on the Travel Channel. Psychic medium Amy Allan performs "walks" through haunted properties, while former NYPD homicide detective Steve DiSchiavi interviews those affected and performs research into the location's history.  The more prominent portions of what Amy perceives during her walk are sketched and later revealed during a meeting with Steve, the clients and herself.

On September 10, 2021, it was announced that the fourteenth season will premiere on October 23, 2021.

Series overview

Episodes

Season 1 (2011)

Season 2 (2012)

Season 3 (2012–13)

Season 4 (2013–14)

Season 5 (2014–15)

Season 6 (2015–16)

Season 7 (2016)

Season 8 (2017)

Season 9 (2018)

Season 10 (2018)

Season 11 (2019)

Season 12 (2019–20)

Season 13 (2021)

Season 14 (2021–22)

References

External links

Lists of American non-fiction television series episodes